{{DISPLAYTITLE:C21H23NO8}}
The molecular formula C21H23NO8 (molar mass: 417.409 g/mol, exact mass: 417.1424 u) may refer to:

 14-Norpseurotin A
 Sorbicillactone A

Molecular formulas